Zagrič (formerly Lačni Vrh or Lačenberg) is a small dispersed settlement in the hills northwest of Čatež in the historical region of Lower Carniola in Slovenia. It belongs to the Municipality of Šmartno pri Litiji and is included in the Central Slovenia Statistical Region.

References

External links
Zagrič at Geopedia

Populated places in the Municipality of Šmartno pri Litiji